Loon Lake is an unincorporated community in Antioch Township, Lake County, Illinois, United States. Loon Lake is located at the junction of Illinois Route 83 and County Route 10A on the northern border of Lake Villa.

References

Unincorporated communities in Illinois
Chicago metropolitan area
Unincorporated communities in Lake County, Illinois